Roberto Streit (born 17 November 1983, in Rio de Janeiro) is a Brazilian racing driver.

Career

Formula Renault
Streit debuted in 2001 in Formula Chevrolet Brazil. His first season was a very successful one, with Streit dominating the championship, and winning the title comfortably. That year, he also won the Italian Formula Renault Winter Series.

The following season, Streit competed in both the Eurocup Formula Renault 2.0, and Formula Renault 2.0 Italy championships for Cram Competition. He finished ninth in the Eurocup standings, scoring two podium places. In the Italian Championship, he took fourth place, scoring three podium places.

For the 2003 season, he remained in both championships but switched to Prema Powerteam. He once again finished ninth in the Eurocup, and also garnered a fourth-place finish in the Italian Championship.

Formula Three
In 2004, Streit stepped up to the Formula Three Euroseries with Prema. He finished tenth in the standings, taking nine points-scoring positions in twenty races, including a podium in the final race of the season at Hockenheim.

During the winter of 2004, Streit signed a contract with the Japanese F3 team Inging to compete full-time in the championship for the upcoming season. He finished sixth in the standings, including a win at Suzuka.

For 2006, he remained in the championship with Inging, and improved to third place with wins at Suzuka, Twin Ring Motegi and Autopolis. He guested at the two final races at Hockenheimring in the Formula Three Euroseries for Prema Powerteam, finishing seventh and fifth respectively.

In 2007, Streit finished as runner-up with seven wins, as he lost out to Kazuya Oshima by ten points.

Formula Nippon
In 2008, he moved to Formula Nippon with the Stonemarket Blaak Cerumo team. He finished thirteenth with one podium at Fuji Speedway. He returned to Formula Three for the Macau Grand Prix, but was forced to retire on the first lap after a clash with Sam Bird.

Sports car racing
Streit concentrated on sports car racing for 2009. He drove for Sangari Team Brazil in the FIA GT Championship. He finished seventh in the standings with one win in 2009 FIA GT Paul Ricard 2 Hours.

Racing career

Career summary

References

External links
 Official site 
 Streit career statistics at Driver Database

Brazilian racing drivers
1983 births
Living people
Italian Formula Renault 2.0 drivers
Formula Renault Eurocup drivers
German Formula Renault 2.0 drivers
Formula 3 Euro Series drivers
Japanese Formula 3 Championship drivers
Formula Nippon drivers
FIA GT Championship drivers
Sportspeople from Rio de Janeiro (city)
Brazilian people of German descent
24 Hours of Spa drivers
Prema Powerteam drivers
Cram Competition drivers
Double R Racing drivers
Team LeMans drivers
Super GT drivers